Anna (Anni) Henriikka Savolainen-Tapaninen (née Savolainen; 29 January 1875 in Nilsiä – 5 December 1952) was a Finnish seamstress, smallholder and politician. She was a member of the Parliament of Finland from 1908 to 1918 and again from 1924 to 1927, representing the Social Democratic Party of Finland (SDP). She was imprisoned from 1918 to 1921 for having sided with the Reds during the Finnish Civil War.

References

1875 births
1952 deaths
People from Nilsiä
People from Kuopio Province (Grand Duchy of Finland)
Social Democratic Party of Finland politicians
Members of the Parliament of Finland (1908–09)
Members of the Parliament of Finland (1909–10)
Members of the Parliament of Finland (1910–11)
Members of the Parliament of Finland (1911–13)
Members of the Parliament of Finland (1913–16)
Members of the Parliament of Finland (1916–17)
Members of the Parliament of Finland (1917–19)
Members of the Parliament of Finland (1924–27)
Women members of the Parliament of Finland
20th-century Finnish women politicians
People of the Finnish Civil War (Red side)
Prisoners and detainees of Finland